Eric Walfred Anderson (May 26, 1970 – December 9, 2018) was an American basketball player. He played college basketball for the Indiana Hoosiers and played two seasons in the National Basketball Association (NBA) for the New York Knicks.

Amateur career
Anderson attended St. Francis de Sales High School on Chicago's far southeast side and was named 1988's Mr. Basketball for the state of Illinois as well as a McDonald's All-American in the same year. He appears in one scene in the documentary Hoop Dreams.

Anderson then enrolled at  Indiana University Bloomington, where he played for the Hoosiers while studying sociology. He was named Most Outstanding Player of 1992 NCAA Tournament's West Regional after helping lead Indiana to the Final Four. He completed his college career with 1,715 points and 825 rebounds.

Professional career
Anderson signed with the New York Knicks for the 1992–93 NBA season as an undrafted free agent. As the team's twelfth man, he played only 44 total minutes in sixteen games, and 39 minutes in eleven games the following season before being waived. He received a loud ovation by fans when inserted in the final six minutes of the Knicks' 114–79 home blowout over the Boston Celtics on February 2, 1994, in which he went scoreless with four personal fouls while the Knicks bench later stood and cheered his drawing an offensive foul. Anderson held NBA career averages of 1.6 points and 1.1 rebounds, and 2-for-2 on three-point field goals. He spent the remainder of his career playing in Europe and with the Fort Wayne Fury of the Continental Basketball Association until retiring in 1998.

Personal life
Anderson was married to fitness guru Tracy Anderson from 1998 to 2008 and had a son named Sam.

Death
Anderson died on December 9, 2018, in Carmel, Indiana. An autopsy was conducted, and preliminary findings suggested that he died of natural causes.

References 

1970 births
2018 deaths
American expatriate basketball people in Italy
American expatriate basketball people in Spain
American expatriate basketball people in Turkey
American men's basketball players
Basketball players from Chicago
BC Andorra players
American expatriate basketball people in Andorra
Fabriano Basket players
Fort Wayne Fury players
Galatasaray S.K. (men's basketball) players
Indiana Hoosiers men's basketball players
Liga ACB players
McDonald's High School All-Americans
New York Knicks players
Pallacanestro Varese players
Parade High School All-Americans (boys' basketball)
Power forwards (basketball)
Undrafted National Basketball Association players
Universiade medalists in basketball
Universiade gold medalists for the United States